Saudi Arabia competed at the 2020 Summer Paralympics in Tokyo, Japan, from 24 August to 5 September 2021.

Medalists

Athletics 

One Saudi Arabian male athlete, Abdulrahman Al-Qurashi (100m T53), successfully to break through the qualifications for the 2020 Paralympics after breaking the qualification limit.

Equestrian 

Saudi Arabian sent one athlete after qualified.

See also 
Saudi Arabia at the Paralympics
Saudi Arabia at the 2020 Summer Olympics

References 

2020
Nations at the 2020 Summer Paralympics
2021 in Saudi Arabian sport